The men's 3000 metres at the 2014 IAAF World Indoor Championships took place on 7 and 9 March 2014.

Records

Qualification standards

Schedule

Results

Heats
Qualification: First 4 in each heat (Q) and the next 4 fastest (q) qualified for the final.

Final

References

3000 metres
3000 metres at the World Athletics Indoor Championships